Grushko is a British television three-part drama series, first broadcast on BBC One on 24 March 1994. Based on the best-selling novel "Dead Meat" by acclaimed author Philip Kerr, the series stars Brian Cox as Colonel Yevgeni Grushko, the tough-minded Head of the Mafia Investigation Division of the St. Petersburg police, as he investigates the murder of a TV journalist which threatens to spark gang warfare.

Boasting Stephen McGann, Donald Sumpter, Andy Serkis and Amanda Mealing amongst the main cast, the series was scripted by Kerr alongside screenwriter Robin Mukherjee. It was panned upon release, particularly by The Independent, in particular for it's lack of authenticity and certain passages of inaudible dialogue. The title sequence was designed by Bob Cosford, who uses a typographic logo to evoke the implied menace of the Russian trucks in the opening scene.

Production archives confirm the series was first commissioned in August 1991, initially in four parts. It was later suggested that instead of individual episodes, the production could air as a one-off drama; it was eventually decided that Grushko would be a three-part series. Philip Kerr had been in the process of writing a second series when the first went to air; however, due to poor ratings, the BBC decided not to pursue a second run. 

A tie-in novel with images from the series was issued by Arrow Books in 1994. The series has to date not been released on any form of home media.

Cast
 Brian Cox as Colonel Yevgeni Grushko
 Stephen McGann as Lieutenant Andrei
 Cathy White as Lieutenant Sasha
 Donald Sumpter as Lieutenant General Kartashov
 Eve Matheson as Nina Grushko
 Amanda Mealing as Tanya Grushko
 Richard Hawley as Dzhumber
 Jack Klaff as Milyukin
 Dave Duffy as Nikolai
 Paul Brennen as Stepan
 Alan Stocks as Oocho
 Rosaleen Linehan as Lena
 Andy Serkis as Pyotr
 Jimmy Yuill as Chazov
 Paul Freeman as Bosenko
 Kathryn Hunter as Dr. Sopova 
 Petronilla Whitfield as Galina
 Harry Miller as Oleg
 Armen Nazikyan as Ilya
 Robert Llewellyn as Petrakov
 David Dixon as Nekrasov

Episodes

References

External links

1994 British television series debuts
1994 British television series endings
1990s British crime television series
1990s British drama television series
BBC television dramas
1990s British television miniseries
English-language television shows
Television shows set in Moscow
Television shows set in Russia